T cell receptor T cell therapy (TCR-T) is a type of cancer immunotherapy. TCR-T therapies use heterodimers made of alpha and beta peptide chains to recognize MHC-presented polypeptide fragments molecules. Unlike CAR-T's cell surface antigens, TCR-T can recognize that larger set of intracellular antigen fragments. However, TCR-T cell therapy depends on MHC molecules, limiting its usefulness.

Each T cell's TCR is specific to one antigen and sits on the T cell's surface. The affinity of human TCRs to tumor antigens is relatively low, which left them unable to recognize and kill tumor cells effectively. The modified T cell has much higher affinity, which enhances both recognition and affinity supporting the recognition of tumor cells.

As of 2021, no TCR-T T cell therapies have been approved by regulatory authorities.

History 
Dr. Michael Steinmetz was the first to move TCR genes across T cells. The recipient T cell then recognized a different antigen, enabling the use of these cells to target non-surface antigens.

One clinical trial modified multiple amino acids, increasing the T cell's affinity for New York esophageal squamous cell carcinoma (NY-ESO-1). This TCR was used to attack NY-ESO-1-overexpressing cancers, such as multiple myeloma. 80% of multiple myeloma patients had at least a good clinical response, and 70% had complete or near-complete response.

Kite Pharma, Juno Therapeutics, Adaptimmune Therapeutics are active in the field.

Process 
Appropriate target antigens are identified by subtraction. First the entire set of antigens presented by tumor cells is identified. Next, those presented by normal cells are screened out, leaving only those unique to the tumorous cells. Then a TCR phage display library is used to pick TCRs with high affinity and specificity. A preclinical safety test watches for off-target effects and cross-reactivity.

Challenges include target selection, TCR identification, affinity screening, safety, time, and cost.

Most targets are limited by MHC class. In addition, hybridization (mismatch) between exogenous and endogenous chains may induce harmful recognition of autoantigens, triggering graft-vs.-host disease. Increased affinity poses a risk of false targeting.

Target malignancies 
Malignant myelomas appear qualified, but the appropriate epitopes have not been identified. Published studies and their target antigens include:

 Acute myeloid leukemia (WT1)

Solid tumors:

In solid tumors local injection is more effective than systemic drug administration, such as injecting T cells into the cerebrospinal fluid in brain tumors. Published studies include:

 Esophageal cancer (MAGE-E4) 
 Metastatic colorectal cancer (TGFβII) 
 Metastatic melanoma (Gp100) 
 Metastatic/malignant melanoma (MAGE-A3) 
 Metastatic melanoma (MART-1) 
 Metastatic melanova/synovial cell carcinoma (NY-ESO-1) 
 Multiple myeloma (NY-ESO-1)

References

Further reading 

 
 
 

Cancer immunotherapy
T cells